A. N. M. Serajur Rahman (1934 – 1 June 2015) was a British journalist of Bengali Muslim descent and broadcaster. From 1960 to 1994, he worked for BBC World Service, and was the deputy chief of BBC Bangla Service before retirement.

Early life
Rahman was born in Chittagong division in the then Bengal Province of the British India. His father, Mawlana Habibur Rahman, was a teacher and scholar at Alia Madrasa in Calcutta. He spent most of his early and formative years in Calcutta, matriculating with distinction in 1947 from Calcutta Mitra Institution School. He was actively involved in the Mukuler Mahfil Youth Organisation. He regularly published articles and short stories in the youth sections of the Daily Azad, Daily Nabajug and Weekly Millat of Calcutta. He regularly participated in programs of All India Radio.

Sometime after the partition of India Rahman moved to Dhaka, and was admitted to Dhaka College. He was actively involved in the Bengali Language Movement. He was elected by his college to liaise with the University of Dhaka Students' Action Committee.

Career
Rahman continued his formal career in journalism. He served in the news departments of the Biweekly Pakistan, Daily Zindegi, Daily Insaf and The Daily Millat. In January 1953, he was appointed editor of the British Information Service in Dhaka. Under his leadership the press section expanded to include 12 journalists. Rahman during this time also edited a daily bi-lingual news bulletin, the fortnightly British Darpan and the magazine Ajker Commonwealth. From 1954 to 1959, he was also a part-time lead writer in The Daily Ittefaq.

In January 1960, Rahman joined the then East Pakistan section of the BBC World Service. He helped to co-ordinate the Bangladesh Liberation War's international publicity. In February 1994, he retired as the Deputy Head of the Bengali Section of the BBC World Service. After his retirement, he wrote columns in different newspapers in Bangladesh.

Awards and recognition
In 2002, Rahman was awarded the Ekushey Padak. In 2004, he was one of 15 people whom Bangladesh high commission in UK honoured for their significant role there during the Bangladesh Liberation War.

Personal life and death
Rahman was married to Sophia Rahman. He had one daughter and son, Susan Rahman and Shapan Rahman, who both died before him.

On 1 June, Rahman died at around 11 am in Royal Free Hospital in London. He was suffering from some critical medical condition and illness for two months, including lung disease and other complications.

See also
British Bangladeshi
List of British Bangladeshis

References

External links

Rahman, Serajur. Mujib's confusion on Bangladeshi deaths. The Guardian. 24 May 2011

1934 births
2015 deaths
Date of birth missing
British Muslims
Bangladeshi emigrants to England
British people of Bangladeshi descent
Bangladeshi journalists
British journalists
Bangladeshi columnists
British columnists
British Asian writers
20th-century British writers
21st-century British writers
BBC people
People from Noakhali District
People from Dhaka
Dhaka College alumni
Recipients of the Ekushey Padak
Deaths from lung disease